The Amgun is a river in Khabarovsk Krai, Russia that flows northeast and joins the river Amur from the left, 146 km upstream from its outflow into sea. The Amgun is formed by the confluence of the Ayakit and Suluk. Its main tributary is the Nimelen. The Amgun teems with fish, such as Siberian salmon, humpback salmon, sturgeon, and carp.

The Amgun was known as Xinggun River (興衮河) in Chinese. At its mouth is the village of Tyr which was a Chinese fort during the Ming and Qing dynasties.

See also
List of rivers of Russia

References

Rivers of Khabarovsk Krai